Paolo Zoppo  (early 16th century) was an Italian painter of the Renaissance period, mainly active in Brescia.

He died suddenly in the town of Desenzano. He is known to have depicted in paint the sack of Brescia in 1512 by Gaston of Foix, Duke of Nemours.

References

People from Brescia
16th-century Italian painters
Italian male painters
Painters from Brescia
Italian Renaissance painters
Year of death unknown
Year of birth unknown